Henry T. Akin (July 31, 1944 – February 16, 2020) was an American basketball player.

Born in Detroit, Michigan, the 6'10", 225 lbs forward-center played two years for Morehead State University. He averaged 20 points and 12 rebounds per game as a sophomore and junior and was an all-Ohio Valley Conference selection. Akin worked for an elevator company for six months before returning to basketball. He transferred to William Carey College but never suited up for the team.

He was selected by the New York Knicks in the second round (11th overall pick) of the 1966 NBA draft and signed for $10,000 per year plus a $1,100 bonus. He played in the NBA for the Knicks in 1966–67, averaging 3.8 points per game. Akin was selected by the Seattle SuperSonics in the 1967 NBA Expansion Draft and played for the Sonics in 1967–68. He played in the ABA for the Kentucky Colonels in 1968–69. Akin was forced to end his basketball career due to knee and ankle problems. He worked as a scout for the SuperSonics before becoming a salesman at a clothes company. Akin worked for Boeing for 20 years before retiring in 2010.

Akin died on February 16, 2020, in Kirkland, Washington, after being on hospice care. Akin had suffered from heart problems for years. He was married to Diana for 54 years and had three daughters, Erin, Shannon, and Amanda.

References

External links 

 Basketball Player Stats
 Espn.com Player Profile
 Realgm.com Player Profile

1944 births
2020 deaths
American men's basketball players
Basketball players from Detroit
Centers (basketball)
Kentucky Colonels players
Morehead State Eagles men's basketball players
New York Knicks draft picks
New York Knicks players
Power forwards (basketball)
Seattle SuperSonics expansion draft picks
Seattle SuperSonics players